A Força do Querer (English title: Edge of Desire) is a Brazilian telenovela produced and aired by TV Globo. It was created by Glória Perez, directed by Rogério Gomes and Pedro Vasconcellos. It premiered on 3 April 2017, replacing A Lei do Amor. The show ran for 29 weeks with a total of 172 episodes and ended on 20 October 2017, being replaced by O Outro Lado do Paraíso.

The telenovela features an ensemble cast of Isis Valverde, Marco Pigossi, Fiuk, Bruna Linzmeyer, Paolla Oliveira, Juliana Paes, Emilio Dantas, Rodrigo Lombardi, Débora Falabella, Dan Stulbach, Lilia Cabral and Maria Fernanda Cândido.

The show deals with contemporary themes that affect modern Brazilian culture, such as drug trafficking, gambling and transsexuality, and has received positive reception from viewers and critics. The show achieved an average viewership of 36 points in the much-coveted 9 pm time slot.

Production 
 
In April 2016, Glória Perez announced her next telenovela, due to premiere in the first half of 2017. She also stated that it would be different from the ones she had produced in the previous 20 years, which featured different settings and culture-oriented storylines. A Força do Querer mainly features romance and is entirely shot in Brazil. Originally titled À Flor da Pele during early stages of production, it was changed to Flor do Querer in November 2016 and to the current title in December 2016.

Casting 
Paolla Oliveira was the first to be cast for the project, and was announced to star in the telenovela in March 2016. Fábio Assunção was originally cast to portray Eugênio but later declined in order to star in a then upcoming television series. Dan Stulbach was then cast.
Leopoldo Pacheco was originally cast as Junqueira but he and Chay Suede preferred Novo Mundo. Suede was the first option to portray Ruy. Daniel Rocha also auditioned for the role of Ruy but Fiuk was preferred over him. Vera Fischer was also cast but due to personal differences with the showrunner, she was replaced by Betty Faria.

The character of Bibi was inspired by Fabiana Escobar, known as "queen of pot". Showrunner Glória Perez initially wanted the character to be the center of a separate miniseries but decided to include it in the telenovela.

Since her role is inspired by a siren, Isis Valverde was prepared for three months in readiness for her character by, Mirella Ferraz, a professional in that part.

Plot 
Promising lawyer Caio is considered for administration of the Garcia Company, one of the largest in the country. However, when Bibi decides to end their relationship, he leaves everything behind, and relocates to the United States. Fifteen years later, Caio returns to Brazil to take up a position in the judiciary and once again meets  Bibi, who failed to complete college and is married to Rubinho. Rubinho goes through a delicate financial condition, as he and Bibi struggle to make ends meet which forces him to enter into the world of crime.

Ruy is prepared to take over the company of his father Eugênio, as the only qualified heir. He is engaged to Cibele, who offers him professional and personal stability. When he travels to Parazinho, he is enchanted by Ritinha, a young woman who loves the fascination she exerts on men, and seems to believe herself to be a mermaid. She continues a game of seduction with Ruy despite being engaged to Zeca, a truck driver who loves her intensely despite the gossips about her activities. On the day of their wedding he learns of Ritinha's fling with Ruy. Fearing for her life, Ritinha runs away with Ruy while Zeca angrily leaves Parazinho.  In another town, Zeca meets Jeiza, a police officer who dreams of becoming a mixed martial arts fighter.

Meanwhile, Ruy's brother Ivan (previously Ivana) has been undergoing female to male gender reassignment, causing conflict with their mother, Joyce. Joyce's relationship with Eugênio begins to crumble when he meets Irene, a seductive woman who tries to break their marriage. Eugênio's older brother Eurico tries to keep everyone under his control, though he can't control the gambling addiction of his wife Silvana.

Cast

Participations

Soundtrack

A Força do Querer: Vol. 1 

A Força do Querer: Vol. 1 is the first installment of the series of soundtracks of the telenovela.

The album consist of an original score by Roberto Carlos. "Sereia" (released on 5 April 2017) was composed specifically for the show.

A Força do Querer: Vol. 2

Reception

Ratings 
The telenovela had an average daily reach of 45 million viewers (number of people who watch at least one minute of the telenovela every day). The plot also swept across social networks and ranked first on the Social Wit List in April 2017, a ranking that highlights the most-commented releases in Latin America.

On its premiere, A Força do Querer registered a viewership rating of 32.9 points, the highest premiere viewership since the 2016 debut of Velho Chico. On its first week of broadcast, it recorded an average of 32 points. It had the second-largest viewership, after Amor à Vida.

The penultimate episode, that aired on 19 October, recorded 48.8 points of average and peaking at 51 points with a 65% share, hitting the record, according to consolidated data of Ibope in Greater São Paulo. With this indices, A Força do Querer had the highest audience since the last episode of Avenida Brasil, which recorded 52 points on 19 October 2012.

On the finale, A Força do Querer had the largest audience since the end of Avenida Brasil. Having aired from 9:15 pm to 11:32 pm, the final episode had a record-setting 50.1 points and peaked at 53 points. These were the best ratings since the finale of Avenida Brasil, which had 51.7 points on 19 October 2012. In Rio de Janeiro, the last episode recorded 49 points in average (highest final indices since Império, which had 50 points).

Cumulatively, the show recorded an average rating of 35.67.

Controversies

The state of Pará 
Since its debut, the telenovela received criticism for not using the northeastern accents in the state of Pará and the depiction of the state, such as the existence of an aquarium located in Ver-o-Peso. There were varied opinions among the viewers, especially those from Pará. Rede Globo and show's creator Glória Perez argued that the show was not set in the capital of Pará but in the fictional city of Parazinho and that the work of fiction has no commitment to be true to reality.

Accusations on glamorization of drug trafficking 
The fact that the plot touches on drug trafficking and other crime aroused the idea that the telenovela was unapologetic to such. The show received a flurry of criticism, mainly by evangelists and conservatives. Pastor and Deputy Marco Feliciano said that, "Rede Globo offered a course for banditry". Showrunner Glória Perez responded to the accusations:

Transexuality 
Before the debut of the telenovela, the subject of transexuality was already causing controversy. Catholic organizations asked that Globo not allow this theme in the show. The theme about gender identity, addressed in the plot by the character Ivan was also not accepted by a portion of the audience, among them also evangelists and conservatives. They accused the network of using the telenovela to popularize gender ideology.

References

External links 
 
 

2017 telenovelas
2017 Brazilian television series debuts
2017 Brazilian television series endings
2017 controversies
Brazilian LGBT-related television shows
Brazilian telenovelas
LGBT-related controversies in television
TV Globo telenovelas
Telenovelas by Glória Perez
Television controversies in Brazil
Transgender-related television shows
Portuguese-language telenovelas
2010s LGBT-related drama television series
Works about organized crime in Brazil